Rumble Fish is a 1983 American drama film directed by Francis Ford Coppola. It is based on the 1975 novel Rumble Fish by S. E. Hinton, who also co-wrote the screenplay with Coppola. The film stars Matt Dillon, Mickey Rourke, Vincent Spano, Diane Lane, Diana Scarwid, Nicolas Cage, and Dennis Hopper.

The film centers on the relationship between a character called The Motorcycle Boy (Rourke), a revered former gang leader wishing to live a more peaceful life, and his younger brother, Rusty James (Dillon), a teenaged hoodlum who aspires to become as feared as his brother.

Coppola wrote the screenplay for the film with Hinton on his days off from shooting The Outsiders. He made the films back-to-back, retaining much of the same cast and crew, particularly Matt Dillon and Diane Lane. Rumble Fish is dedicated to Coppola's brother August.

The film is notable for its avant-garde style with a film noir feel, shot on stark high-contrast black-and-white film, using the spherical cinematographic process with allusions to French New Wave cinema and German Expressionism. Rumble Fish features an experimental score by Stewart Copeland, drummer of the musical group the Police, who used a Musync, a new device at the time.

Plot

Set in Tulsa, Oklahoma, the film begins in a diner called Benny's Billiards, where local tough guy Rusty James is told by Midget that rival group leader Biff Wilcox wants to meet him that night in an abandoned garage lot for a fight. Accepting the challenge, Rusty James then talks with his friends: the wily Smokey, loyal B.J., and tall, nerdy Steve; who all have a different take on the forthcoming fight. Steve mentions that Rusty James' older brother, "The Motorcycle Boy," would not be pleased with the fight as he had previously created a truce forbidding gang fights, or "rumbles." Rusty James dismisses him, saying that the Motorcycle Boy (whose real name is never revealed) has been gone for two months, leaving without explanation or promise of return.

Rusty James visits his girlfriend, Patty, then meets his cadre and walks to the abandoned garage lot, where Biff and his buddies suddenly appear. The two battle, with the fight ending when Rusty James disarms Biff and beats him almost unconscious. The Motorcycle Boy arrives dramatically on his motorcycle, and his appearance distracts Rusty James, who is slashed by Biff in the side with a shard of glass. Incensed, the Motorcycle Boy sends his motorcycle flying into Biff. The Motorcycle Boy and Steve take Rusty James home (past Officer Patterson, a street cop who's long hated the Motorcycle Boy) and nurse him to health through the night. Steve and the injured Rusty James talk about how the Motorcycle Boy is 21 years old, colorblind, partially deaf, and noticeably aloof; the last trait causing many to believe he is insane.

The Motorcycle Boy and Rusty James share the next evening with their alcoholic, welfare-dependent father, who says that the Motorcycle Boy takes after his mother whereas, it is implied, Rusty James takes after him. Things start to go wrong for Rusty James, and he's eventually kicked out of school after his frequent fights. Despite Rusty James's desire to resume gang activity, the Motorcycle Boy implies that he has no interest in doing so. Shortly after, Rusty James goes to a party at a lakeside cabin hosted by Smokey, where he has sex with another girl, causing Patty to break up with him. At Benny's sometime later, Rusty James sees that Patty and Smokey have begun dating, and Smokey confesses that he set up the entire party so that Rusty James would cheat on Patty, driving her to leave him for Smokey.

The two brothers and Steve head across the river one night to a strip of bars, where Rusty James enjoys briefly forgetting his troubles. The Motorcycle Boy mentions that he located their long-lost mother during his recent trip while she was with a movie producer, which took him to California, although he did not reach the ocean. Later, Steve and Rusty James wander drunkenly home, and are attacked by thugs, but both are saved by the Motorcycle Boy. As he nurses Rusty James again, the Motorcycle Boy tells him that the gang life and the rumbles he yearns for and idolizes are not what he believes them to be. Steve calls the Motorcycle Boy crazy, a claim which the Motorcycle Boy does not deny, further prompting Rusty James to believe his brother is insane, just like his runaway mother supposedly was.

Rusty James meets up with the Motorcycle Boy the next day in a pet store, where the latter is strangely fascinated with the Siamese fighting fish, which he refers to as "rumble fish." Officer Patterson suspects they will try to rob the store. The brothers leave and meet their father, who explains to Rusty James that, contrary to popular belief, neither his mother nor brother are crazy, but rather they were both born with an acute perception. The brothers go for a motorcycle ride through the city and arrive at the Pet Store, where the Motorcycle Boy breaks in and starts to set the animals loose. Rusty James makes a last-gasp effort to convince his brother to reunite with him, but the Motorcycle Boy refuses, explaining that the differences between them are too great for them to ever have the life Rusty James speaks of. The Motorcycle Boy takes the fish and rushes to free them in the river, but is fatally shot by Officer Patterson before he can. Rusty James, after hearing the gunshot, finishes his brother's last attempt while a large crowd of people converges on his body.

Rusty James finally reaches the Pacific Ocean (something the Motorcycle Boy failed to do) and enjoys the shining sun and flocks of birds flying around the beach. He also tries to forget what happened to his brother.

Cast
 Matt Dillon as Rusty James
 Mickey Rourke as The Motorcycle Boy
 Diane Lane as Patty
 Dennis Hopper as Father
 Diana Scarwid as Cassandra
 Vincent Spano as Steve
 Nicolas Cage as "Smokey"
 Chris Penn as B.J. Jackson
 Larry Fishburne as "Midget"
 William Smith as Officer Patterson
 Glenn Withrow as Biff Wilcox
 Tom Waits as Benny, The Barkeeper
 Michael Higgins as Principal Harrigan
 Sofia Coppola as Donna, Patty's Sister
 S. E. Hinton as Prostitute (cameo)

Production

Development and writing
Francis Ford Coppola was drawn to S. E. Hinton's novel Rumble Fish because of the strong personal identification he had with the subject matter — a younger brother who hero-worships an older, intellectually superior brother, which mirrored the relationship between Coppola and his brother, August. A dedication to August appears as the film's final end credit. The director said that he "started to use Rumble Fish as my carrot for what I promised myself when I finished The Outsiders". Halfway through the production of The Outsiders, Coppola decided that he wanted to retain the same production team, stay in Tulsa, and shoot Rumble Fish right after The Outsiders. He wrote the screenplay for Rumble Fish with Hinton on Sundays, their day off from shooting The Outsiders.

Pre-production
Warner Bros. was not happy with an early cut of The Outsiders and passed on distributing Rumble Fish. Despite the lack of financing, Coppola recorded the film on video, in its entirety, during two weeks of rehearsals in a former school gymnasium and afterwards was able to show the cast and crew a rough draft of the film. To get Rourke into the mindset of his character, Coppola gave him books written by Albert Camus and a biography of Napoleon. The Motorcycle Boy's look was patterned after Camus complete with trademark cigarette dangling out of the corner of his mouth — taken from a photograph of the author that Rourke used as a visual handle. Rourke remembers that he approached his character as "an actor who no longer finds his work interesting".

Coppola hired Michael Smuin, a choreographer and co-director of the San Francisco Ballet, to stage the fight scene between Rusty James and Biff Wilcox because he liked the way he choreographed violence. He asked Smuin to include specific visual elements: a motorcycle, broken glass, knives, gushing water and blood. The choreographer spent a week designing the sequence. Smuin also staged the street dance between Rourke and Diana Scarwid, modeling it after one in Picnic featuring William Holden and Kim Novak.

Before filming started, Coppola ran regular screenings of old films during the evenings to familiarize the cast, and in particular the crew, with his visual concept for Rumble Fish. Most notably, Coppola showed Anatole Litvak's Decision Before Dawn, the inspiration for the film's smoky look, F. W. Murnau's The Last Laugh to show Matt Dillon how silent actor Emil Jennings used body language to convey emotions, and Robert Wiene's The Cabinet of Dr. Caligari, which became Rumble Fish'''s "stylistic prototype". Coppola's extensive use of shadows, oblique angles, exaggerated compositions, and an abundance of smoke and fog are all hallmarks of these German Expressionist films. Godfrey Reggio's Koyaanisqatsi, shot mainly in time-lapse photography, motivated Coppola to use this technique to animate the sky in his own film.

Filming
Six weeks into production, Coppola made a deal with Universal Studios and principal photography began on July 12, 1982 with the director declaring, "Rumble Fish will be to The Outsiders what Apocalypse Now was to The Godfather." He shot in deserted areas at the edge of Tulsa with many scenes captured via a hand-held camera in order to make the audience feel uneasy. He also had shadows painted on the walls of the sets to make them look ominous. In the dream sequence where Rusty James floats outside of his body Matt Dillon wore a body mold which was moved by an articulated arm and also flown on wires.

To mix the black-and-white footage of Rusty James and the Motorcycle Boy in the pet store looking at the Siamese fighting fish in color, Burum shot the actors in black and white and then projected that footage on a rear projection screen. They put the fish tank in front of it with the tropical fish and shot it all with color film. Filming finished by mid-September 1982, on schedule and on budget.

The film is notable for its avant-garde style, shot on stark high-contrast black-and-white film, using the spherical cinematographic process with allusions to French New Wave cinema. The striking black-and-white photography of the film's cinematographer, Stephen H. Burum, lies in two main sources: the films of Orson Welles and German cinema of the 1920s. When the film was in its pre-production phase, Coppola asked Burum how he wanted to film it and they agreed that it might be the only chance they were ever going to have to make a black-and-white film.

Music
Soundtrack

Coppola envisioned a largely experimental score to complement his images. He began to devise a mainly percussive soundtrack to symbolize the idea of time running out. As Coppola worked on it, he realized that he needed help from a professional musician. He asked Stewart Copeland, then drummer of the musical group The Police, to improvise a rhythm track. Coppola soon concluded that Copeland was a far superior composer and let him take over. Copeland recorded street sounds of Tulsa and mixed them into the soundtrack with the use of Musync—a nusic and tempo editing hardware and software system invented by Robert Randles (subsequently nominated for an Oscar for Scientific Achievement), to modify the tempo of his compositions and synchronize them with the action in the film. 

An edited version of the song "Don't Box Me In", a collaboration between Copeland and singer/songwriter Stan Ridgway, was released as a single and enjoyed significant radio airplay.

All songs written by Stewart Copeland, except where noted.
 "Don't Box Me In" (Copeland, Stan Ridgway) – 4:40
 "Tulsa Tango" – 3:42
 "Our Mother Is Alive" – 4:16
 "Party at Someone Else's Place" – 2:25
 "Biff Gets Stomped by Rusty James" – 2:27
 "Brothers on Wheels" – 4:20
 "West Tulsa Story" – 3:59
 "Tulsa Rags" – 1:39
 "Father on the Stairs" – 3:01
 "Hostile Bridge to Benny's" – 1:53
 "Your Mother Is Not Crazy" – 2:48
 "Personal Midget/Cain's Ballroom" – 5:55
 "Motorboy's Fate" – 2:03

Differences from the novel
Coppola did not employ the flashback structure of the novel. He also removed a few passages from the novel that further established Steve and Rusty James' relationship in order to focus more on the brothers' relationship.
 In the novel, Rusty James and the motorcycle boy are three years younger than they are portrayed in the film. In the novel, the Motorcycle Boy is only 17 whereas in the film, he is 21.
 In the film, the Motorcycle Boy is more attentive and paternal toward Rusty James than he is in the novel.
 In the novel, Rusty James uses a bike chain to disarm Biff, whereas in the film he uses a sweater.
 In the novel Biff slashes Rusty James with a knife rather than a pane of glass and Motorcycle Boy breaks Biff's wrist instead of ramming him with his motorcycle.
 The Motorcycle Boy's self-destructive behavior at the film's conclusion is less motivated in the film than in the novel. 
 In the novel, Rusty James gets arrested after Motorcycle Boy is shot and never makes the promise to ride the motorcycle.
 The film ends with Rusty James arriving at the ocean on a motorcycle while the novel ends with Rusty James meeting Steve in California five years after Motorcycle Boy's death.

Themes
The theme of time passing faster than the characters realize is conveyed through time-lapse photography of clouds racing across the sky and numerous shots of clocks. The black-and-white photography was meant to convey the Motorcycle Boy's color blindness while also evoking film noir through frequent use of oblique angles, exaggerated compositions, dark alleys, and foggy streets.

Release
Theatrical
Coppola utilized many new filmmaking techniques never before used in the production of a commercial motion picture, and the film was well received on the independent circuit. At the San Sebastián International Film Festival, it won the International Critics' Big Award. At its world premiere at the New York Film Festival however, there were several walkouts and at the end of the screening, boos and catcalls. Former head of production at Paramount Pictures Michael Daly remembers legendary producer Robert Evans' reaction to Coppola's film, "Evans went to see Rumble Fish, and he remembers being shaken by how far Coppola had strayed from Hollywood. Evans says, 'I was scared. I couldn't understand any of it.'"

Home media

The film was first released on VHS in 1984 and on DVD on September 9, 1998 with no extra material. A special edition was released on September 13, 2005 with an audio commentary by Coppola, six deleted scenes, a making-of featurette, a look at how Copeland's score was created and the "Don't Box Me In" music video. In August 2012, The Masters of Cinema Series released a special Blu-ray edition of the film (and accompanying Steelbook edition) in the UK. In April 2017, the Criterion Collection released the film on Blu-ray and DVD. Chuck Bowen, in a review of the blu-ray edition, referred to Rumble Fish as one "of Francis Ford Coppola’s most underrated and deeply felt films." He suggests that with the blu-ray edition, it "receives a gorgeously ephemeral restoration that should hopefully jump-start its reevaluation as an essential American work."

Reception
Box officeRumble Fish was released on October 8, 1983 and it only grossed $18,985 on its opening weekend, playing in one theater. Its widest release was in 296 theaters and it  was a box office disaster, grossing only $2.5 million domestically. Its estimated budget was $10 million; a large sum for the time.

Critical response
On review aggregation website Rotten Tomatoes, Rumble Fish holds an approval rating of 75% based on 36 reviews, with an average score of 6.3/10. The site's critical consensus reads, "Rumble Fish frustrates even as it intrigues, but director Francis Ford Coppola's strong visual style helps compensate for a certain narrative stasis." On Metacritic, the film has a weighted average score of 63 out of 100, based on 8 critics, indicating "generally favorable reviews."

Jay Scott wrote for The Globe and Mail, "Francis Coppola, bless his theatrical soul, may have the commercial sense of a newt, but he has the heart of a revolutionary, and the talent of a great artist." Jack Kroll in his review for Newsweek stated: "Rumble Fish is a brilliant tone poem ... Rourke's Motorcycle Boy is really a young god with a mortal wound, a slippery assignment Rourke handles with a fierce delicacy.". David Thomson has written that Rumble Fish is "maybe the most satisfying film Coppola made after Apocalypse Now". Francis Ford Coppola's daughter, filmmaker Sofia Coppola, famously named it as her favorite among her father's movies in an interview with The Guardian. Coppola himself has variously called it his favorite of his own movies and as among his three favorites, saying it "was the film I really wanted to make".

Film critic Roger Ebert gave the film three-and-a-half out of four stars and wrote, "I thought Rumble Fish was offbeat, daring, and utterly original. Who but Coppola could make this film? And, of course, who but Coppola would want to?" In her review for The New York Times, Janet Maslin wrote that "the film is so furiously overloaded, so crammed with extravagant touches, that any hint of a central thread is obscured". Gary Arnold in The Washington Post wrote, "It's virtually impossible to be drawn into the characters' identities and conflicts at even an introductory, rudimentary level, and the rackety distraction of an obtrusive experimental score ... frequently makes it impossible to comprehend mere dialogue". Time magazine's Richard Corliss wrote, "In one sense, then, Rumble Fish is Coppola's professional suicide note to the movie industry, a warning against employing him to find the golden gross. No doubt: this is his most baroque and self-indulgent film. It may also be his bravest." David Denby in New York and Andrew Sarris in The Village Voice gave the film harsh reviews.

AccoladesRumble Fish won the highest prize in the 32nd San Sebastián International Film Festival, the International Critics' Big Award.

References

Further reading
 Chown, Jeffrey. Hollywood Auteur: Francis Coppola. New York: Praeger, 1988.
 Cowie, Peter. Coppola. Suffolk: St. Edmundsbury, 1989.
 A Conversation With Stephen Burum, ASC. International Cinematographers Guild.
 Goodwin, Michael, and Naomi Wise. On the Edge: The Life and Times of Francis Coppola''. New York: Morrow, 1989.
Jenkins, Chadwick. "The Ineluctability of Time in Coppola Drama, 'Rumble Fish'." PopMatters, June 20, 2017.

External links

 
 
 
 
 
 
 
Rumble Fish: Lose Yourself an essay by Glenn Kenny at the Criterion Collection

1983 films
1980s teen drama films
American black-and-white films
American gang films
American teen drama films
American Zoetrope films
Films scored by Stewart Copeland
Films about brothers
Films based on American novels
Films directed by Francis Ford Coppola
Films set in Tulsa, Oklahoma
Films set in Oklahoma
Films shot in Oklahoma
Films partially in color
Films with screenplays by Francis Ford Coppola
Southern Gothic films
Universal Pictures films
1983 drama films
1980s English-language films
1980s American films